Anderson José de Jesus Costa (born 30 January 1980) is a Brazilian former professional footballer who played as a striker.

Career
Anderson Costa initially came to FR Yugoslavia for a trial at First League side Rad in May 2002. He later signed with the Belgrade club and played eight games in the first half of the 2002–03 season, before going on loan to Second League side Dinamo Pančevo. In early 2006, Anderson Costa returned to Brazil and joined XV de Piracicaba.

In September 2006, Anderson Costa moved back to Europe and signed with Portuguese club Camacha. He spent the rest of his career in the lower leagues of Portugal, before retiring in 2017.

He also played Austrian side TSV St. Johann and Turkish Safranbolu Belediyespor.

References

External links
 
 

A.D. Camacha players
Association football forwards
Brazilian expatriate footballers
Brazilian expatriate sportspeople in Belgium
Brazilian expatriate sportspeople in Portugal
Brazilian expatriate sportspeople in Serbia and Montenegro
Brazilian footballers
C.F. União players
Clube Oriental de Lisboa players
Esporte Clube XV de Novembro (Piracicaba) players
Expatriate footballers in Austria
Expatriate footballers in Belgium
Expatriate footballers in Portugal
Expatriate footballers in Serbia and Montenegro
Expatriate footballers in Turkey
First League of Serbia and Montenegro players
FK Dinamo Pančevo players
FK Rad players
GS Loures players
RFC Liège players
Sportspeople from Salvador, Bahia
1980 births
Living people